Rhondda Cynon Taf is a county borough in South Wales. In 2020 the population was approximately 241,900.

In the United Kingdom, the term listed building refers to a building or other structure officially designated as being of special architectural, historical, or cultural significance. Listing was begun by a provision in the Town and Country Planning Act 1947. Once a building is listed, strict limitations are imposed on the modifications allowed to its structure or fittings and alterations require listed building consent. In Wales, authority for listing or delisting, under the Planning (Listed Buildings and Conservation Areas) Act 1990, rests with the Welsh Ministers, though these decisions are based on the recommendations of Cadw. There are around 30,000 listed buildings in Wales and these are categorised into three grades: Grade I (one), II* (two star) and II (two). Grade II* denotes "particularly important buildings of more than special interest" and makes up about seven per cent of the total number of listed buildings in Wales.

There are 36 Grade II* listed buildings in Rhondda Cynon Taf.

Buildings

|}

See also

 List of scheduled monuments in Rhondda Cynon Taf
 Grade I listed buildings in Rhondda Cynon Taf
 Registered historic parks and gardens in Rhondda Cynon Taf

Notes

References

Bibliography

External links

Rhondda Cynon Taf County Borough Council listed building information

 
Rhondda Cynon Taf II*